Jordanian Americans  are Americans who are descended from the Jordanian people. In 2014, the American Community Survey reported that there were 80,120 Jordanian Americans in the United States.

History

Pre-1967 
The history of the Jordanian immigration to the United States is relatively recent. The first identifiable wave of immigration from Jordan to the United States occurred after the Second World War (1945). Those first Jordanians settled in Chicago, (especially in the Near West and Southwest Sides sections), New York City, and the Southwest and West Coast states (i.e. California). Over 5,000 Jordanians arrived to the United States in the 1950s.

These early migrants were forced to work as immigrants because of poverty that Jordan suffered at the time, caused by the 1948 Arab–Israeli War, which took place in this small country. They were a group of hard workers that included businessmen and doctors, between others. Many men lived temporarily in the USA and returned with their families to Jordan after several years working or studying there. In those early years, people in the Jordanian East Bank and West Bank Palestinians could travel to the United States with Jordanian passports, creating the undefined category "Palestinian – Jordanian."

After 1967 
In the mid 1960s, due to U.S. immigration laws and the Six-Day War of 1967 in Jordan, the number of Jordanians who emigrated to the United States exceeded the 11,000 people. At this time, the majority chose to settle in Western cities and in the southwest of the country, except the wealthy Jordanians who felt more comfortable in the suburbs of large cities. Then in the 1970s, a civil war broke out in Jordan, causing 27,535 Jordanians emigrated to the USA. In the 1980s, annually emigrated around 2,500 Jordanian to the USA. By then, the Jordanian community in the United States had grown at a rapid pace, and it already represented a large population. This was in large part related to the Arab-Israeli war in Jordan, as well as the Black September of 1971. Therefore, a substantial number of Jordanians who settled in the United States at this time were war refugees. The total number of Jordanian immigrants from 1820 to 1984 was 56,720. This wave of Jordanian emigration was due to internal strife in his country, as well as economic issues. Salaries were in the United States were higher than in Jordan, which incentivized workers to immigrate.

Demography

U.S cities 
Currently, the New York City Metropolitan Area, notably including Paterson, New Jersey, attracts the highest number of legal Jordanian immigrants admitted to the United States. The Little Ramallah community of South Paterson in New Jersey is home to a rapidly growing Jordanian immigrant population. Yonkers, New York has a sizeable Jordanian population.  The Jordanian American community in Washington, DC held a candlelight vigil after the death of King Hussein. Chicago also maintains, even today, a large Jordanian population.

In the time period between World War II and the 1980s, most Jordanians who emigrate to the USA were men whose ages ranged from 20 and 39 and they married people. An important part of them were university graduates (30%), and worked in professional positions (40%). However, some immigrants lived only temporarily in the USA. Most Jordanians emigrate to the USA looking for better wages than they get in Jordan. One difference of Jordanians from other Middle Eastern immigrants is that they often bring their families to the US when they get a job there. The cohesion of their communities has hindered the Americanization of Jordanians. Most of Jordanians live in neighborhoods formed by people from their country. However, Jordanians who are fluent in English have greater interaction with the majority population. Their relationship with the rest of the population is reinforced when they have a good level of education and good jobs. Also, people from urban areas of Jordan be adapt more quickly in the US than those from rural areas. As with other immigrant groups, children raised in the United States integrate into American society more quickly than migrant adults. Jordanians generally speak Arabic, but many also speak English.

Employment and Economic traditions
Most of Jordanian Americans are professors/teachers, scientists, doctors, engineers and entrepreneurs. It is often men who will work outside the home, similar to the traditions in Jordan and many other Middle Eastern Countries. Many Jordanians will emigrate to the United States to study at university, and some of them are financially helped by the government of Jordan.

Cuisine 

Many cities have Jordanian restaurants such as the Petra House in Portland,  Oregon.

Interactions with other ethnic groups
Most Jordanian Americans interact with other Arabs due to cultural and linguistic affinities.

Religion
Majority of the Jordanians in diaspora are Sunni Muslims, but the many include Catholics, Greek Orthodox Christians and to a lesser extent, Protestants and Evangelicals.

Organizations 
Jordanians have many organizations in the U.S., including the Jordanian American Association and the Jordanian American Association of New York. The Jordanian American Association is based in South San Francisco, and its goal is to establish social activities for the Jordanian Americans of Northern California The Jordanian American Association of New York aims to relate to Jordanian residents in different parts of the city, and to help establish relationships between them and their families in Jordan.

See also 

 Jordan–United States relations

References

Further reading
 Miller, Olivia, and Norman Prady. "Jordanian Americans." Gale Encyclopedia of Multicultural America, edited by Thomas Riggs, (3rd ed., vol. 2, Gale, 2014), pp. 579-589. online

External links
 Jordan Times newspaper
 ED229297 - American, Jordanian, and Other Middle Eastern National Perceptions.
 Embassy of the United States Amman, Jordan.
 Relations with the United States.
 American Chamber of Commerce in Jordan Celebrates its Tenth Anniversary.
 U.S. Arab population up more than 75 percent since 1990, census report shows

 
 
American
Arab American
Middle Eastern American